Wildes is a surname. Notable people with the surname include:

Harry Emerson Wildes (1890-1982), American sociologist, historian, and writer 
Hayley Wildes (born 1996), Australian rules footballer
Kevin Wildes (born 1954), American university president
Leon Wildes, American lawyer
Michael Wildes (born 1964), American lawyer and politician
Sarah Wildes (1627–1692), American woman wrongly convicted of witchcraft